Johny Grün (19 June 1897 – 1940) was a Luxembourgian weightlifter. He competed at the 1920 Summer Olympics and the 1924 Summer Olympics.

References

External links
 

1897 births
1940 deaths
Luxembourgian male weightlifters
Olympic weightlifters of Luxembourg
Weightlifters at the 1920 Summer Olympics
Weightlifters at the 1924 Summer Olympics
Sportspeople from Luxembourg City